Kerstin Jeppsson (born 29 October 1948) is a Swedish composer.

She was born in Nyköping, Sweden, and graduated from the Royal College of Music in Stockholm, where she studied composition with Maurice Karkoff. She received a fellowship to continue her studies at the Cracow Conservatory, where she studied with Krzysztof Meyer and Krzysztof Penderecki for composition and Jozef Radwan for conducting. Jeppsson received a bachelor of arts degree from the University of Stockholm in 1977, and graduated with a Master of Fine Arts from the California Institute of the Arts in Santa Clarita in 1979, where she studied with Mel Powell for composition and Daniel Schulman for conducting.

Works
Jeppsson has composed vocal compositions, instrumental works and chamber music, many of which have been recorded. Recorded works include:

4 småstycken En dröm
Percussione con forza
Prometheus
Embrio 
Stråkkvartett no. 2
I förändring  Lyrics: Ulla Olin
Impossibile Lyrics: Göran Sonnevi
I Till Dig Lyrics: Karin Boye
I Rosen  Lyrics: Edith Södergran
III Gå ut i skogen  Lyrics: Ulla Olin
II Ovetande Lyrics: Ulla Olin
III Kärleksdikt Lyrics: Elsa Grave
II Upptäckt Lyrics: Edith Södergran
II Du är min renaste tröst Lyrics: Karin Boye
III De mörka änglarna Lyrics: Karin Boye

Jeppsson's works have been issued on CD, including:

Kerstin Jeppsson String Quartet No 2, Embrio (Phono Suecia) ASIN: B000O0575Y
Percussione con forza (2000-05-31), Anders Blomqvist & Anders Hultqvist & Kerstin Jeppsson & Christer Lindwall & Kent Olofsson & Karin Rehnqvist
Canto cromatico per due violini (2003), Duo Gelland, Nosag records CD 121

References

1948 births
20th-century classical composers
California Institute of the Arts alumni
Living people
Swedish music educators
People from Nyköping Municipality
Stockholm University alumni
Swedish classical composers
Women classical composers
Swedish women composers
Women music educators
20th-century women composers
20th-century Swedish women